Trichoaspis julus is a species of mite placed in its own family, Trichoaspididae, in the order Mesostigmata.

References

Mesostigmata